Saman Tahmasebi (born 26 July 1985) is a naturalized Azerbaijani wrestler who formerly represented his birthplace Iran. Between 2006 and 2015 he won five medals at the world championships. He also took part in the 2008, 2012 and 2016 Olympics.

References

External links
 

1985 births
Living people
Iranian male sport wrestlers
Azerbaijani male sport wrestlers
Wrestlers at the 2008 Summer Olympics
Wrestlers at the 2012 Summer Olympics
Wrestlers at the 2016 Summer Olympics
Olympic wrestlers of Iran
Olympic wrestlers of Azerbaijan
Olympic competitors from Iran who represented other countries
Wrestlers at the 2006 Asian Games
European Games competitors for Azerbaijan
Wrestlers at the 2015 European Games
Naturalized citizens of Azerbaijan
World Wrestling Championships medalists
Iranian emigrants to Azerbaijan
People from Sanandaj
Asian Games competitors for Iran
Asian Wrestling Championships medalists